Albert Purcell (3 July 1913 – 2001) was an English footballer who played four games as a left winger for Port Vale in the mid-1930s.

Career
Purcell played for Kidsgrove Liverpool Road, before joining Football League Second Division side Port Vale as an amateur in November 1933. He made his debut in a 2–0 defeat at Old Trafford to Manchester United on 14 April 1934, and also played at The Old Recreation Ground in a 4–0 home over Plymouth Argyle seven days later. After recovering from a serious nose injury in 1934, he played two games in the 1934–35 season, before being released in the summer.

Career statistics
Source:

References

1913 births
2001 deaths
Sportspeople from Burslem
English footballers
Association football wingers
Port Vale F.C. players
English Football League players